Jamestown is a hamlet in Fife, Scotland, on the south side of Inverkeithing's Inner Bay. The nearby Jamestown Viaduct carries the Fife Circle Line over the hamlet, and the M90 passes by to the west.

Jamestown takes its name from James Reid, who converted the 19th century chemical works situated here into dwellings. In the 1850s, the Ordnance Survey described it as "a cluster of cottage houses occupied by workmen employed in the different quarries in the neighbourhood". Jamestown's prominent Naval Base Mansions were built in 1909 to house labourers from the dockyard at Rosyth. The building is B-listed, and is now used as a furniture store. There was formerly a Roman Catholic chapel in Jamestown, built to serve the many Irish dockworkers who came to the area. Opened in 1913 and dedicated to St Peter in Chains, it was replaced by a new church in Inverkeithing in 1977. The area's Irish heritage is referenced in the name of Shamrock Terrace, a block of tenements at the bottom of Ferryhills Road.

References

Villages in Fife